Colonia Catriel Airport  is an airport serving the city of Catriel in the Río Negro Province of Argentina.

References

External links
Organismo Regulador del Sistema Nacional de Aeropuertos

Airports in Río Negro Province